Çaykavak is a mountain pass in Niğde Province, Turkey.

Çaykavak is situated on the northern slopes of Toros Mountains on the highway  connecting Niğdeto the Mediterranean coast.

References 

Mountain passes of Turkey
Landforms of Niğde Province
Central Anatolia Region